One third of the City of Lincoln Council in Lincolnshire, England is elected each year, followed by one year when there is an election to Lincolnshire County Council instead. The council is divided up into 11 wards, electing 33 councillors, since the last boundary changes in 2007.

Political control
Prior to 1974, Lincoln was a county borough, independent from any county council. Under the Local Government Act 1972 it became a non-metropolitan district, with Lincolnshire County Council providing county-level services in the city. The first election to the reconstituted city council was held in 1973, initially operating as a shadow authority before coming into its powers on 1 April 1974. Political control of the council since 1973 has been held by the following parties:

Leadership
The leaders of the council since 2008 have been:

Council elections
1973 City of Lincoln Council election
1976 City of Lincoln Council election
1979 City of Lincoln Council election (New ward boundaries)
1980 City of Lincoln Council election
1982 City of Lincoln Council election (City boundary changes took place but the number of seats remained the same)
1983 City of Lincoln Council election
1984 City of Lincoln Council election
1986 City of Lincoln Council election
1987 City of Lincoln Council election
1988 City of Lincoln Council election
1990 City of Lincoln Council election
1991 City of Lincoln Council election
1992 City of Lincoln Council election
1994 City of Lincoln Council election
1995 City of Lincoln Council election
1996 City of Lincoln Council election
1998 City of Lincoln Council election
1999 City of Lincoln Council election (New ward boundaries)
2000 City of Lincoln Council election
2002 City of Lincoln Council election
2003 City of Lincoln Council election
2004 City of Lincoln Council election
2006 City of Lincoln Council election
2007 City of Lincoln Council election (New ward boundaries)
2008 City of Lincoln Council election
2010 City of Lincoln Council election
2011 City of Lincoln Council election
2012 City of Lincoln Council election
2014 City of Lincoln Council election
2015 City of Lincoln Council election
2016 City of Lincoln Council election (New ward boundaries)
2018 City of Lincoln Council election
2019 City of Lincoln Council election
2021 City of Lincoln Council election
2022 City of Lincoln Council election

Result maps

By-election results

1997-2001

2001-2005

2005-2009

2013-2017

2017-2021

References

External links
By-election results 
City of Lincoln Council

 
Council elections in Lincolnshire
Elections in Lincoln, England
District council elections in England